Liberia competed at the 2020 Summer Olympics in Tokyo. Originally scheduled to take place from 24 July to 9 August 2020, the Games have been postponed to 23 July to 8 August 2021, because of the COVID-19 pandemic. It was the nation's thirteenth appearance at the Olympics since its debut in 1956, except for three occasions. Liberia failed to register any athletes at both the 1968 and 1992 Summer Olympics, and also joined the rest of the African nations to boycott the 1976 Summer Olympics in Montreal.

Competitors
The following is the list of number of competitors in the Games.

Athletics

Liberian athletes achieved the entry standards, either by qualifying time or by world ranking, in the following track and field events (up to a maximum of 3 athletes in each event):

Track & road events

References

External links 

Nations at the 2020 Summer Olympics
2020
2021 in Liberian sport